The Naval Special Warfare Command, commonly known as the Royal Thai Navy SEALs (an acronym for SEa–Air–Land), is the special operations force of the Royal Thai Navy.

The unit was set up in the name of Underwater Demolition Assault Unit in 1956 with the assistance of the U.S. Government. A small element within the Navy SEALs has been trained to conduct maritime counter-terrorism missions. The unit has close ties with the United States Navy SEALs and conducts regular training exercises.

History 

In 1952, the Thai Ministry of Defence considered forming a diving unit. At a meeting with the Royal Thai Army and Royal Thai Police it was agreed that the Royal Thai Navy would be responsible for establishing the unit. Representatives of the Thai Navy met with officers from the United States Military Assistance Advisory Group (MAAG) to discuss possible training. On 13 June 1952, the Thai Navy approved the training program for the diving unit that included Underwater Demolition Team (UDT) training. Unfortunately at the time there were not enough instructors from the United States to make the project happen and so it was temporarily put on hold.

In 1953, the Overseas Southeast Asia Supply Company (SEA Supply), a CIA front company, that provided assistance to the Thai Police, offered to provide the initial diving training to the Thai Navy and also to the Thai Police, which had received parachute training. The Thai Navy approved a contingent of seven personnel and the Thai Police approved a contingent of eight personnel to receive training at Saipan island in the United States. At Saipan island, the Thai Navy and Thai Police received eleven weeks training. The Thai Navy contingent requested further training and the establishment of a Thai Navy Underwater Demolition Team on 24 November 1953 under the command of a Lieutenant.

In 1956, the Royal Thai Navy formed a small combat diver unit. In 1965, the unit was expanded and reorganised with US Navy assistance.  Three years later, it was again reorganised with US Navy assistance, dividing the unit between an underwater demolitions team and a SEAL team. The UDT was tasked with salvage operations, obstacle clearance, and underwater demolitions. The SEAL team was tasked with reconnaissance and intelligence missions.

In the 1991 book South-East Asian Special Forces by Kenneth Conboy, the author wrote that the Navy SEALs were organised into two units, SEAL Teams One and Two, with a strength of 144 personnel with each SEAL Team divided into four platoons. On 18 March 1991, the Navy SEALs were re-designated as the Naval Special Warfare Group, Royal Thai Fleet and were to report directly to the Royal Thai Fleet. The unit was expanded and organised into three divisions: special combat, special warfare school, and support.

On 7 August 2008, the Naval Special Warfare Group was re-designated as the Naval Special Warfare Command, Royal Thai Fleet, in order to increase the unit size and its capability for dealing with any future threats.

Mission
 Prepare readiness of personnel for operations, study and training of naval special warfare 
 Special operations squad for naval special warfare and perform other special tasks as will be assigned
 Naval Special Warfare School has to train, study and evaluate of naval special warfare. Command and control the trainees and students of Naval Special Warfare Command.
 Naval Special Warfare Support Division supports logistics service to the unit under the responsibility.

Organization
 Naval Special Warfare Command Headquarter
 Naval Special Warfare Training Center
 1st Naval Special Warfare Group
 2nd Naval Special Warfare Group

Training Course
Training on an assault course takes about 7–8 months. It is considered the longest military training course in Thailand, divided into 5 periods as are following;

 Introduction to basic training practicing exercise and solving various obstacles takes approximately 3 weeks.*
 The actual training takes about 6 weeks.
 Intense training, known as "Hell Week", lasts for continuously 120 hours without breaks.
 Various tactical training
 Tactical training in real conditions takes about 2 months

Badge 
Upon completion of the course, students will receive a badge of competence which was designed by Admiral Pan Rukkaew. The components of the badge have the following meaning

 Shark meaning the god of the sea, fierce, formidable, elegant and strong.
 The waves mean the horror of the sea that is always wave. But the shark is not even fear.
 Anchor means a sailor. In the past, courses only accepted sailors. But now the unit has also received additional army, air force and police.
 Thai national flag means sacrifice for the nation, religion and king.

Operational deployments 

Most of the operations of the Navy SEALs are highly sensitive and are rarely divulged to the public. Navy SEALs have been used to gather intelligence along the Thai border during times of heightened tension.

Navy SEALs have participated in anti-piracy operations in the Gulf of Thailand. They have also participated in salvage and rescue operations, and have supported Royal Thai Marine Corps training exercises.

Thai Navy SEALs have deployed on Royal Thai Navy warships for anti-piracy operations in the Gulf of Aden off the coast of Somalia as part of Combined Task Force 151. The CTF 151 was established on 12 January 2009 as a response to piracy attacks in Somalia. The task eventually were succeed as a piracy events in the region have been reduced.

On February 13, 2013, the Battle of Bacho occurred when 50 RKK members attacked a 2nd Rifle Company, 32nd Task Force Narathiwat of the Royal Thai marine base. The royal thai marine base had already prepared due to receiving clues about the plans to attack the stronghold 2–3 days before. The marine commander has put in a defensive strategy with additional of the 11 members of Recon and 17 Thai Navy SEALs. After clashing resulted in 16 deaths from attacker side with non fatality for both Recon and Navy SEALs members.

In June 2018, Navy SEALs responded to a request for assistance to search for a junior football team in the Tham Luang Nang Non cave system. The Navy SEALs coordinated a rescue of the football team from the flooded cave system with assistance from international cave and support divers.

Totally 127 current and former Navy SEALs participated in the rescue. While delivering supplies for the rescue, former Navy SEAL Petty Officer 1st class Saman Kunan died after losing consciousness underwater and could not be resuscitated. A year after the rescue, another Navy SEAL, petty officer 1st class Beirut Pakbara died following a blood infection he contracted in the caves.

However, all junior football team members including 12 junior football players together with their assistant coach were safely rescued.

Equipment

Small arms

Special Operations Crafts

Engagements
 Cold War
 Communist insurgency in Thailand
 Communist insurgency in Malaysia
 Third Indochina War
 Vietnamese border raids in Thailand
 Global War on Terrorism
 OEF - Horn of Africa
 Combined Task Force 150
 Anti-Piracy operation in Gulf of Aden
 Southern Insurgency
 Battle of Bacho (2013)
 Anti-Piracy in strait of Malacca
 MT Orkim Harmony hijacking
 Tham Luang cave rescue

In popular culture
 2018: The Crown Princess is a Thai television series, premiered on May 14, 2018  and last aired on June 19, 2018 on Channel 3. It starred Urassaya Sperbund and Nadech Kugimiya and produced by Ann Thongprasom.Because her life was put into danger after her coronation, Crown Princess Alice (Urassaya Sperbund) of the country Hyross was secretly sent to Thailand, where Dawin Samuthyakorn (Nadech Kugimiya), a Lieutenant Commander of the Thai Navy and Navy SEAL, becomes her bodyguard.

 2018: Against The Elements: Tham Luang Cave Rescue, a documentary with exclusive interviews produced by Channel News Asia in Singapore.

 2018: Thai Cave Rescue, an episode of science television series Nova (season 45, episode 14).

 2019: The Cave, a feature film written and directed by Thai-Irish filmmaker Tom Waller. It features many of the real-life cave divers as themselves.

 2021: The Rescue, a National Geographic documentary released on 8 October 2021. The film made use of body-cam footage recorded by the divers involved in the operation.

 2022:  Thirteen Lives is a 2022 American biographical survival film based on the Tham Luang cave rescue directed and produced by Ron Howard, from a screenplay written by William Nicholson. The film stars Viggo Mortensen, Colin Farrell, Joel Edgerton, and Tom Bateman. Royal Thai Navy SEALs, led by Captain Arnont, arrive to search for the missing boys, but find the dive too difficult to locate the team. Vernon Unsworth, a local British caver, shares his extensive knowledge of the complex and dangerous cave and suggests the authorities get in touch with the British Cave Rescue Council. British cavers Rick Stanton and John Volanthen attempt the dive, finding the boys and coach four kilometres from the entrance. In an attempt to deliver wetsuits to the boys in preparation for the rescue, former Thai Navy Seal Saman Kunan drowns.

 2022: Thai Cave Rescue, a Netflix limited series was released on September 22, 2022. It is the only dramatic production that was granted access to the members of the Wild Boars soccer team.

 2022: The Trapped 13: How We Survived The Thai Cave, a Netflix documentary will release on October 5, 2022. The documentary features interviews with selected members of the Wild Boars'' team.

See also
 Royal Thai Special Force
 Thai Force Reconnaissance Marine
 Royal Thai Air Force Security Force Regiment
 Royal Thai Air Force Commando
 Royal Thai Marine Corps

Notes

Citations

References

Further reading

External links
 Naval Special Warfare Command official website 
 Thai Navy SEAL official Facebook 
 ทำความรู้จักกับ หน่วย SEAL (Get to know the SEAL unit) 
 หน่วยซีล (SEALing Unit): หน่วยซีล นักทำลายใต้น้ำจู่โจม (SEAL Force Attacker) 

Special forces of Thailand
Royal Thai Navy
Armed forces diving
Military units and formations established in 1956
1956 establishments in Thailand
Naval special forces units and formations